Jarrey Foster (born December 9, 1996 in Houston) is an American basketball player. He played college basketball for the SMU Mustangs of the AAC.

As a freshman, Foster posted 4.9 points per game. Foster averaged 9.9 points per game as a sophomore and made 44.4 percent of three-pointers. As a junior, Foster averaged 13.2 points, 5.9 rebounds, 2.7 assists and 1.2 blocks in 32 minutes per game. On January 17, 2018, he partially tore his ACL going for a layup five minutes into a game against Wichita State. Despite being initially labelled a knee sprain, Foster missed the rest of the season. His injury caused an increase in minutes for Jahmal McMurray. Foster declared for the 2018 NBA draft but did not hire an agent to preserve his collegiate eligibility. He announced he was returning to SMU on May 9. Coming into his senior season, Foster was named to the Preseason Second Team All-AAC. He was hampered by injuries and averaged 6.9 points, 3.6 rebounds, and 1.5 assists per game.

After graduating from SMU in 2019, Foster founded JF Elite Basketball, an organization that provides consulting, training and camps and clinics in the Dallas and Houston areas. In 2020, Foster established the apparel company, One Zero.

References

External links
College statistics at sports-reference.com
College profile at smumustangs.com

1996 births
Living people
American men's basketball players
Basketball players from Houston
SMU Mustangs men's basketball players
Shooting guards